Benign neonatal sleep myoclonus (BNSM) is the occurrence of myoclonus (jerky movements) during sleep.  It is not associated with seizures.

BNSM occurs in the first few weeks of life, and usually resolves on its own within the first 3-4 months of life. It often worries parents because it can appear like seizures, but is not. Features that can help distinguish this condition from seizures include: The myoclonic movements only occur during sleep, when baby is woken up the myoclonic movements stop, normal EEG, normal neurological examination, normal developmental examination. The myoclonic jerks occur during non-REM sleep.

References

External links

Extrapyramidal and movement disorders